The Philippines national rugby sevens team is a minor national sevens side. The 2012 Hong Kong Sevens was their first appearance in an IRB Sevens World Series. They were 1 of 4 Asian teams that qualified through regional tournaments to be included in the 2012 Hong Kong Sevens, it is also a qualifying tournament for inclusion in the 2012–13 IRB Sevens World Series. After the Philippines won third place against South Korea in the 2012 Singapore Sevens Series, they gained qualification to the 2013 Rugby World Cup Sevens in Moscow. The Philippines finished third at the 2018 Asia Rugby Sevens Series, and qualified to the 2019 Hong Kong Sevens World Series qualifier. At the tournament, the team defeated Zimbabwe and advanced to quarter-finals, where they lost to Asian rival Hong Kong.

Honours
 2009 Brunei Rugby 7s Runners up

Tournament history

Rugby World Cup Sevens

Asian Games

Southeast Asian Games

The Philippine national team also won the rugby sevens event at the 2005 Southeast Asian Games. However rugby sevens was just a site sport or demonstration event and was not counted in the final medal tally. The rugby sevens tournament also included club sides some which are based in Macau and Sri Lanka which are not part of the ASEAN.

2012 Hong Kong Sevens
Pool E

Ranking Matches

Players

Notable players
 Andrew Wolff
 Gareth Holgate
 Matthew Saunders
 Andrew Everingham
 Oliver Saunders
 Michael Letts

Coaches
  Rick Hartley (2006–2009)
  Al Caravelli (2012–2013)
  Matthew Cullen (2013–2014)
  Geoff Alley (2014–2015)
  Frano Botica (2016–?)
  Josh Sutcliffe (2021–)

References

External links
 Philippine Rugby Football Union official website

Rugby union in the Philippines
S
National rugby sevens teams